St. Severin's Old Log Church is a historic Roman Catholic church located in Cooper Township, Pennsylvania, United States within the Diocese of Erie.

Description
The church was built by German settlers in about 1851 and served until about 1880. It is a -story log structure with a gable roof and steeple. The building measures approximately forty-five feet in length by twenty-four feet in width and rests upon a rock foundation.

It was listed on the National Register of Historic Places in 1975.

See also 
 National Register of Historic Places listings in Clearfield County, Pennsylvania

References

External links
St. Severin's Old Log Church, Coopers Settlement, Pennsylvania - This Old Church on Waymarking.com

1851 establishments in Pennsylvania
19th-century Roman Catholic church buildings in the United States
Churches in Clearfield County, Pennsylvania
Log buildings and structures on the National Register of Historic Places in Pennsylvania
National Register of Historic Places in Clearfield County, Pennsylvania
Roman Catholic churches completed in 1851
Churches on the National Register of Historic Places in Pennsylvania
Wooden churches in the United States